The Capture of Hormuz (Persian: بازپس گیری هرمز) was a combined Anglo-Persian expedition that successfully captured the Portuguese garrison at Hormuz Island after a ten-week siege, thus opening up Persian trade with England in the Persian Gulf. Before the capture of Hormuz, the Portuguese had held the Castle of Hormuz for more than a century, since 1507 when Afonso de Albuquerque established it in the capture of Hormuz, giving them full control of the trade between India and Europe through the Persian Gulf. According to Stephen Neill, the capture of Hormuz entirely changed the balance of power and trade.

Anglo-Persian alliance

The English component consisted of a force supplied by the East India Company consisting of five warships and four pinnaces. The Persians had recently gone to war with the Portuguese, and a Persian army was besieging the Portuguese fort on Kishm, but English assistance was required to capture Hormuz. Shah Abbas wished to obtain English support against the Portuguese, and the commander Imam Quli Khan, son of Allahverdi Khan, negotiated with the English to obtain their support, promising the English that they would grant them access to the Persian silk trade. An agreement was signed, providing for the sharing of spoils and customs dues at Hormuz, the repatriations of prisoners according to their faith, and the payment by the Persians of half of the supply costs for the fleet.

Operations

The Portuguese present quickly surrendered, and the English casualties were few, but included the famous explorer William Baffin.

The Anglo-Persian fleet then sailed to Hormuz and the Persians disembarked to capture the town. The English bombarded the castle and sank the Portuguese fleet present. After some resistance, the Portuguese surrendered Ormuz on 4 May 1622. The Portuguese were forced to retreat to another base at Maskat.

Although Portugal and Spain were in a dynastic union from 1580 to 1640, England and Portugal were not at war, and the Duke of Buckingham threatened to sue the company for the capture, but renounced his claim when he received the sum of 10,000 pounds, supposedly 10% of the proceedings of the capture of Hormuz. James I also received the same sum from the company when he complained as such: "Did I deliver you from the complaint of the Spaniards, and do you return me nothing".

The capture of Hormuz gave the opportunity for the company to develop trade with Persia, attempting to trade English cloth and other commodities for silk, which did not become very profitable due to the lack of Persian interest and small quantity of English goods. The English soldier and merchant Robert Shirley also took an interest in developing the Anglo-Persian trade.

See also
 Portuguese conquest of Hormuz
 British occupation of Bushehr

Notes

References
 K. N. Chaudhuri, The English East India Company: The Study of an Early Joint-Stock Company 1600–1640, Taylor & Francis, 1999, 
 Percy Molesworth Sykes, A History of Persia, Read Books, 2006,

Further reading
 

Battles involving the British East India Company
Conflicts in 1622
17th century in Iran
Military history of England
Battles involving Portugal
Capture
Iran–Portugal military relations
Iran–United Kingdom relations
Portuguese Empire
1622 in Asia
Battles involving Safavid Iran